The 32nd parallel south is a circle of latitude that is 32 degrees south of the Earth's equatorial plane. It crosses the Atlantic Ocean, Africa, the Indian Ocean, Australasia, the Pacific Ocean and South America.

At this latitude the sun is visible for 14 hours, 19 minutes during the December solstice and 9 hours, 58 minutes during the June solstice.

Around the world
Starting at the Prime Meridian and heading eastwards, the parallel 32° south passes through:

{| class="wikitable plainrowheaders"
! scope="col" width="125" | Co-ordinates
! scope="col" | Country, territory or ocean
! scope="col" | Notes
|-
| style="background:#b0e0e6;" | 
! scope="row" style="background:#b0e0e6;" | Atlantic Ocean
| style="background:#b0e0e6;" |
|-valign="top"
| 
! scope="row" | 
| Western Cape Northern Cape Western Cape Eastern Cape
|-
| style="background:#b0e0e6;" | 
! scope="row" style="background:#b0e0e6;" | Indian Ocean
| style="background:#b0e0e6;" |
|-
| 
! scope="row" | 
| Western Australia – Rottnest Island
|-
| style="background:#b0e0e6;" | 
! scope="row" style="background:#b0e0e6;" | Indian Ocean
| style="background:#b0e0e6;" |
|-
| 
! scope="row" | 
| Western Australia – passing through Perth
|-
| style="background:#b0e0e6;" | 
! scope="row" style="background:#b0e0e6;" | Indian Ocean
| style="background:#b0e0e6;" | Great Australian Bight
|-
| 
! scope="row" | 
| South Australia
|-
| style="background:#b0e0e6;" | 
! scope="row" style="background:#b0e0e6;" | Indian Ocean
| style="background:#b0e0e6;" | Great Australian Bight
|-valign="top"
| 
! scope="row" | 
| South Australia New South Wales
|-
| style="background:#b0e0e6;" | 
! scope="row" style="background:#b0e0e6;" | Pacific Ocean
| style="background:#b0e0e6;" | Passing just south of Ball's Pyramid, 
|-
| 
! scope="row" | 
|
|-
| 
! scope="row" | 
| Passing just south of Rosario (32°57′S 60°40′W)
|-
| 
! scope="row" | 
|
|-
| 
! scope="row" | 
| Rio Grande do Sul
|-
| style="background:#b0e0e6;" | 
! scope="row" style="background:#b0e0e6;" | Atlantic Ocean
| style="background:#b0e0e6;" |
|}

See also
31st parallel south
33rd parallel south

s32